Legrand may refer to:

 Legrand (surname)
 LeGrand (band)
 Legrand (company), a French producer of hardware for electrical installations
 Legrand, California, former name of Le Grand, California
 Former name of the Ben Freha municipality in the Oran wilaya in Algeria

See also
Le Grand (disambiguation)
Lagrand, a former commune, Hautes-Alpes, France
Lagrande, a computer hardware technology
Justice LeGrand (disambiguation)